The East Blackland Solar Project, also known as the Pflugerville Solar Farm, is a 144 megawatt (MW) alternating current (AC) solar photovoltaic (PV) power plant near Pflugerville, Texas. Originally a 60 MWAC plant, a ceremonial ground breaking was announced in December 2010 with completion expected in June 2013, but construction start was delayed until July 2020, because no buyer for the electricity was available for contract.

RRE Power was the original developer on the project. The current developer is Recurrent Energy, LLC, a division of Canadian Solar. CIT Group arranged for financing of $162 million of the $234 million project, which finally broke ground in July 2020. Austin Energy will buy electricity generated by the project under the terms of a 15-year power purchase agreement (PPA).

The system was sold to Duke Energy in 2020, before construction was completed. The project began operating in July 2021.

See also

List of photovoltaic power stations
Renewable energy in the United States
Renewable portfolio standard
Solar power in Texas

References

External links
 Pflugerville Solar Farm Part 2 Feb 7, 2021 -- drone flyover video of the construction site, showing a large fraction of the panels already installed.

Solar power stations in Texas
Photovoltaic power stations in the United States
Buildings and structures in Travis County, Texas